HMS Lincoln was a 50-gun fourth rate ship of the line of the English Royal Navy, launched at Woolwich Dockyard on 12 September 1695.

Lincoln was lost on 29 January 1703 when she foundered.

Notes

References

Lavery, Brian (2003) The Ship of the Line - Volume 1: The development of the battlefleet 1650-1850. Conway Maritime Press. .

Ships of the line of the Royal Navy
1690s ships